Drepanosticta submontana (bordered knob-tipped shadowdamsel) is a species of damselfly in the family Platystictidae. It is endemic to Sri Lanka.  Its natural habitats are subtropical or tropical moist lowland forests and rivers. It is threatened by habitat loss.

References

Sources

Damselflies of Sri Lanka
Insects described in 1933
Taxonomy articles created by Polbot
Taxobox binomials not recognized by IUCN